Pizzaboy or Pizza Boy or variation, may refer to:

People
 pizza delivery boy
 Sal Rinauro (pro-wrestler), who wrestled under the ringname "Pizza Boy"

Fictional characters
 Pizzaboy, a character from the Portuguese comic book The Adventures of Dog Mendonça & Pizzaboy
 Pizza Boy, a character from the webseries Home at Last (web series)
 The Pizza Boy, a character form the British children's stop-motion show Roary the Racing Car
 Pizza Boy (aka Marky), a character from the British soap opera EastEnders, see List of EastEnders characters (2018)

Film and television
 Pizza Boy (TV episode) 2017 season 1 episode 2 of Room 104
 The Pizza Boy (TV episode) 2002 number 26 season 2 episode 4 of According to Jim, see List of According to Jim episodes
 Pizza Boy (animated short) 1996 animated short film from the anthology series What a Cartoon!

Music
 Pizza Boy (2012 song), hiphop song from the 2012 mixtape London Boy
 Pizza Boy (2008 song), comedic song with David Cross from the album Awesome Record, Great Songs! Volume One
 Pizza Boy (2007 song), a song by Jim Bob off the album A Humpty Dumpty Thing

Other uses
 Pizza Boy, a fictional pizzeria from Grand Theft Auto: Vice City, see List of Grand Theft Auto: Vice City characters

See also

 
 
 
 
 Pizzaman (disambiguation)
 Pizza Guy (disambiguation)